Megan Lloyd (born November 5, 1958) is an American illustrator of children's books. A book she illustrated, The Little Old Lady Who Was Not Afraid of Anything, was a Publishers Weekly seasonal bestseller for multiple years. Another book, Fancy That, received a starred review from Publishers Weekly.

Lloyd lives in Pennsylvania.

Selected works 

 Williams, Linda. The Little Old Lady Who Was Not Afraid of Anything. New York: HarperTrophy. 1988.
Guiberson, Brenda Z. Cactus Hotel. Henry Holt and Company. 1991.
Kimmel, Eric A. Baba Yaga: A Russian Folktale. Holiday House. 1991
O'Connor, Jane, and Robert O'Connor. Super Cluck. HarperCollins. 1991
Guiberson, Brenda Z. Spoonbill Swamp. Henry Holt. 1992.
Guiberson, Brenda Z. Lobster Boat. Henry Holt and Company. 1993.
Kindt McKenzie, Ellen. The Perfectly Orderly House. Henry Holt & Company. 1994.
Birdseye, Tom. A Regular Flood of Mishap. Holiday House. 1994
 Esbensen, Barbara Juster. Dance with Me. New York: HarperCollins Childrens Books. 1995.
White, Linda. Too Many Pumpkins. Holiday House. 1996.
Otto, Carolyn. What Color is Camouflage? HarperCollins. 1996.
Jenkins, Priscilla Belz. Falcons Nest on Skyscrapers. HarperCollins. 1996.
Kimmel, Eric A. Seven at One Blow. Holiday House. 1998.
Berger, Melvin. Chirping Crickets. HarperCollins. 1998.
 Tews, Susan. The Gingerbread Doll. New York: Clarion Books. 2001.
 Williams, Linda. Horse in the Pigpen. New York: HarperCollins. 2002.
 Hershenhorn, Esther. Fancy That. New York: Holiday House. 2003. STARRED REVIEW
Spinelli, Eileen. Thanksgiving at the Tappletons. New York: HarperTrophy. 2004. (reissue edition)
 Edwards, Pamela Duncan. The Mixed-Up Rooster. New York: Katherine Tegen Books. 2006.
Miller, Bobbi. Davy Crockett Gets Hitched. Holiday House. 2009.
White, Linda. Too Many Turkeys. Holiday House. 2010.
White, Becky. Betsy Ross. Holiday House. 2011.
 Shore, Diane Z. This Is the Feast. New York: HarperCollins. 2008.
 Spinelli, Eileen. A Big Boy Now. New York: HarperCollins. 2012.
Miller, Bobbi. Miss Sally Ann and the Panther. Holiday House. 2012

References

External links 

 Interview in "Thoughts on the Making of Pioneer Church"

1958 births
Living people
American children's book illustrators